John Hargreaves (born 2 December 1945) is an English former professional snooker player.

Snooker career
As an amateur, he won the 1981 Pontins Spring Open, beating Cliff Wilson 7–2 in the final.

Hargreaves turned professional in 1983. He was beaten in his first matches in the qualifying rounds of the 1983 Professional Players Tournament (0–5 by Mario Morra), the 1983 UK Championship (4–9 by Ian Williamson and the 1984 World Snooker Championship (5–10 to Eddie McLaughlin. He did however record wins over Warren King (5–3) and Billy Kelly (5–4) in the qualifying rounds of the 1984 Classic before losing 1–5 to Mark Wildman in the third qualifying round. Having failed to gain any ranking points, we was unranked in the snooker world rankings 1984/1985.

Following the 1984–85 snooker season, during which he did not progress beyond the qualifying rounds of any tournament, Hargreaves was the lowest ranked of 102 players in the Snooker world rankings 1985/1986. Despite again failing to get past the qualifying rounds during the 1985–86 snooker season, Hargreaves improved his ranking to 92nd, a career high.

He again failed to reach the final stages of any tournament in the 1986–87 snooker season, and in the 1987–88 snooker season played only one match, losing 4–5 to Morra in the first qualifying round of the 1987 International Open. It was to be his last professional tournament appearance.

Career finals

Pro-am finals: 1 (1 title)

References

1945 births
Living people
English snooker players